Blue Fin is a 1978 Australian family film directed by Carl Schultz and starring Hardy Krüger, Greg Rowe and Elspeth Ballantyne. It is based on a 1969 Australian novel written by Colin Thiele.

Plot
Based on the children's novel by South Australian author Colin Thiele, this is a father and son story about tuna fishing of Southern Blue Fin tuna in South Australia's Port Lincoln fishing district. Accident-prone son Snook is forever making mistakes much to the chagrin of his father Pascoe. But when tragedy strikes the fishing boat during a deep sea fishing trek in the Southern Ocean, the boy is called on to become a man in a rites of sea passage to reconcile his past mishaps and save both his father and the ship from certain disaster.

Twelve-year-old Steve Pascoe is nicknamed 'Snook' by everyone in Port Lincoln. He's thin and long-faced, like the fish he's named after. At school he's no good at sport and, at home, his father scorns him. Snook joins his father and fellow crewmen on a tuna-fishing expedition, when disaster strikes. It is up to Snook to save himself and his father from a desperate situation.

Cast
Hardy Krüger as Bill Pascoe
Greg Rowe as Steve "Snook" Pascoe
Liddy Clark as Ruth Pascoe
Elspeth Ballantyne as Mrs. Pascoe
John Jarratt as Sam Snell
Hugh Keays-Byrne as Stan

Production
The film is an unofficial follow up to Storm Boy (1976) with the same writer and star, also adapted from a Colin Thiele novel. The South Australian Film Corporation (SAFC) did not want to use Henri Safran as director, though, so employed another director from the ABC, Carl Schultz.

The film was shot in Streaky Bay in mid 1978.

Reshoots
During post production editor Rod Adamson claimed the film would not cut together. Five weeks after filming had completed, Schultz had to leave the film to take up a directing job at the ABC. Accordingly, Matt Carroll of the SAFC called in Bruce Beresford, who was under contract to them, to re-shoot some sequences. Some of these had to be done using a body double for Hardy Kruger since he had returned to Europe. Schultz was supportive of Beresford stepping in but was unhappy with the fact he supervised the final re-cut.

Proposed Remake
In 2017 it was announced the movie would be remade.

DVD release
A DVD was released on 1 January 2003.

References

External links
 

Blue Fin at Oz Movies
 Blue Fin at the National Film & Sound Archive
Blue Fin at Screen Australia
Blue Fin at the New York Times
Pacific International Enterprises

1978 films
1978 drama films
1978 independent films
Australian drama films
Australian independent films
Films about fishing
Films based on Australian novels
Films directed by Carl Schultz
Films set in South Australia
Survival films
Australian novels adapted into films
1978 directorial debut films
1970s English-language films